Elisa Shua Dusapin, born 23 October 1992 in Sarlat-la-Canéda, France, is a Franco-Korean writer currently living in Switzerland.

In 2016, Elisa Shua Dusapin published her first novel, Hiver à Sokcho, which won numerous awards, including the Prix Robert-Walser, Prix Alpha and the Prix Régine-Deforges.

Her second novel, Les Billes du Pachinko, was published in 2018.

Bibliography 
Novels
Hiver à Sokcho (2016). Winter in Sokcho, trans. Aneesa Abbas Higgins (Daunt Books, 2020; Open Letter Books, 2021).
 Les Billes du Pachinko (2018). The Pachinko Parlour, trans. Aneesa Abbas Higgins (Daunt Books, 2022; Open Letter Books, 2022).
 Vladivostok Circus (2020)

Novellas

 C'était une nuit de fièvre (2011). Published in Contes et Nouvelles (Prix Interrégional Jeunes Auteurs).
 L’œil sans paupière (2018). Published in Le Temps.

Musicals

 M'sieur Boniface (2015)
 Olive en bulle (2018)
Other
Le regard du Lièvre (2018), photos by René Lièvre with text by Elisa Shua Dusapin

Awards and honors 
 2016: Prix Robert-Walser for Hiver à Sokcho
 2017: Prix Régine Desforges for Hiver à Sokcho
 2019: Prix suisse de littérature for Les Billes du Pachinko
 2021: National Book Award for Translated Literature for Winter in Sokcho, translated from the French by Aneesa Abbas Higgins

References 

People from Porrentruy
Swiss women novelists
1992 births
Living people
National Book Award winners